The Estera Foundation was created by Miriam Shaded in Warsaw, Poland as a reaction to the humanitarian crisis that evolved through the civil war in Syria. The transport of many Syrian Christians to Poland was acknowledged by international media, the Foundation was often criticized for helping only Christians.

The Foundation organized refugees' travel, accommodation and supports each family financially with 2.600 PLN per month, funded exclusively by private and church donations.

On July 10/11, 2015 158 refugees were brought in by the Foundation (55 families) half of which soon moved to Germany. As of January 2016, only 35 of these refugees stayed in Poland.

Many international media wrote about the Estera Foundation in connection to the rescue of Christian families from Syria, for example Financial Times, Agence France Presse, Euronews, Der Spiegel, Die Welt, Berliner-Zeitung, Tages-Anzeiger, The Times of Israel and politics.co.uk. A large part of refugees brought in by the Foundation moved on to other European countries.

Ms Shaded complained about manipulation with information about the activities of the Foundation in the media. As an example, she mentions the claims circulated in the media that of brought refugees were only 10 or 12 children supposedly based on an arbitrary criterion of "children between 2-13 years old". In fact even with this criterion the number is 26. For the range of 0-13 the number is 30, and in range of 0-18, the number of persons is 46.

References

External links
http://fundacjaestera.pl/en/
https://www.youtube.com/channel/UCTsyS1MUlNJazjwMco__inA International YouTube-Channel of the Estera-Fund

Human rights organisations based in Poland